Phlorotannins are a type of tannins found in brown algae such as kelps and rockweeds or sargassacean species, and in a lower amount also in some red algae. Contrary to hydrolysable or condensed tannins, these compounds are oligomers of phloroglucinol (polyphloroglucinols). As they are called tannins, they have the ability to precipitate proteins. It has been noticed that some phlorotannins have the ability to oxidize and form covalent bonds with some proteins. In contrast, under similar experimental conditions three types of terrestrial tannins (procyanidins, profisetinidins, and gallotannins) apparently did not form covalent complexes with proteins.

These phenolic compounds are integral structural components of cell walls in brown algae, but they also seem to play many other secondary ecological roles such as protection from UV radiation and defense against grazing.

Biosynthesis and localization 
Most of the phlorotannins' biosynthesis is still unknown, but it appears they are formed from phloroglucinols via the acetate-malonate pathway.

They are found within the cell in small vesicles called physodes, where the soluble, polar fraction is sequestrated, and as part of the cell wall, where they are insoluble and act as a structural component. Their concentration is known to be highly variable among different taxa as well as among geographical area, since they respond plastically to a variety of environmental factors. Brown algaes also exsude phlorotannins in surrounding seawater. For these reasons, it has been suggested that phlorotannins act as photoprotective substances. Further studies with Lessonia nigrescens and Macrocystis integrifolia demonstrated that both UV-A and UV-B radiation can induce soluble phlorotannins and that there is a correlation between induction of phlorotannins and reduction in the inhibition of photosynthesis and DNA damage, two major effects of UV radiation on vegetal tissues. The fact that phlorotannins are exudated in surrounding water enables them to reduce incident UV exposure on kelp meiospores, phytoplankton and other kelp forests inhabitants, where brown algal biomass is high and water motion is low.

They may also be involved in metal sequestration such as divalent metal ions Sr2+, Mg2+, Ca2+, Be2+, Mn2+, Cd2+, Co2+, Zn2+, Ni2+, Pb2+ and Cu2+. If the chelating properties of phlorotannins have been demonstrated in vitro, in situ studies suggest that this characteristic may be species-specific.

Algicidal effect 
Studies demonstrated that phlorotannins can act as an algicide against some dinoflagellates species.

Therapeutic properties 
It has demonstrated that phlorotannins can have anti-diabetic, anti-cancer, anti-oxidation, antibacterial, radioprotective and anti-HIV properties. However, in vivo studies on the effects of these compounds are lacking, most of the research having so far been done in vitro. Regarding anti-allergic property, there is in vivo study on the effect of these compounds.

References

External links 
 Riitta Koivikko. 2008. Brown algal phlorotannins: Improving and applying chemical methods, Ph. D. Thesis, University of Turku, Turku, Finland.
 

 
Brown algae